Police Academy 6: City Under Siege is a 1989 American comedy crime film starring Bubba Smith, David Graf and Michael Winslow. It was directed by Peter Bonerz and written by Stephen Curwick, based on characters created by Neal Israel and Pat Proft. The film was given a PG rating for violence and language. This was the fifth and last Police Academy sequel to be released in the year immediately following the previous installment of the series. It would take five years until the release of the following film, Police Academy: Mission to Moscow. Police Academy 6: City Under Siege was also the last film in the series to feature Bubba Smith, Marion Ramsey, Bruce Mahler, Lance Kinsey and George R. Robertson as Hightower, Hooks, Fackler, Proctor and Commissioner Hurst respectively.

Plot
In the city the police are investigating a series of robberies along the old 51 bus route in the area of the city known as Wilson Heights. Captain Harris (G.W. Bailey) and Lt. Proctor (Lance Kinsey) stake out a bank, but the Wilson Heights gang, composed of Ace (Gerrit Graham) a skilled gunman, Flash (Brian Seeman) an acrobatic martial artist, and Ox (Darwyn Swalve) a strong man, manages to elude capture.

In his office, the mayor is furious with the latest crime spree and reprimands Harris and Commissioner Hurst (George R. Robertson) for his precinct's slow response. The governor is involved now, he brought in special team to stop the robberies and that is Commandant Lassard. The mayor orders Harris and Hurst to work with Commandant Lassard (George Gaynes) to apprehend the gang. Lassard assembles a seven-man team consisting of Hightower (Bubba Smith), Tackleberry (David Graf), Jones (Michael Winslow), Hooks (Marion Ramsey), Callahan (Leslie Easterbrook), Fackler (Bruce Mahler), and Lassard's nephew, Nick (Matt McCoy).

At the site of the gang’s latest robbery, a bank, the police academy team discovers clues that suggest that the Wilson Heights gang are being orchestrated by some other shadowy figure. After canvassing the neighborhood for any information on the Wilson Heights gang with little success, Nick stumbles upon a paper reporting an antique diamond heading to a museum, and gets an idea to use it as bait. However, the robbers nab the diamond anyway by cutting a hole in the truck and escaping through the sewer system. Nick then decides to go undercover to get information regarding a possible hideout, but Harris insists on going instead, and botches the job after Proctor accidentally knocks him over the balcony. Commandant Lassard and his men are later suspended after jewelry from the gang's last robbery is found in Lassard's office, pending an investigation.

The team decides to clear his name by investigating and solving the crimes themselves. Having Hooks access data files from a computer, Nick deduces that the robberies are occurring along the old bus line in the city, thus intentionally lowering property values in that part of the city prior to the announcement of a new replacement line system. They also learn that someone must be leaking information to the criminals, which is why they are always one step ahead of the police.

The police academy force finds and does battle with the Wilson Heights gang during a city wide blackout, taking down Ace, Flash, and Ox, while Nick chases the leader. A pursuit follows, which leads to Commissioner Hurst's office, where they find Commissioner Hurst. But, after the real Commission Hurst arrives, Hightower unmasks the fake Hurst to reveal that the mastermind has been the mayor all along. Caught, the mayor admits that Captain Harris has been unwittingly leaking information during his daily meetings with him, and how he could have made billions off the properties if it had not been for Lassard and his team. Hurst then apologizes to Lassard and reinstates him and his team, and a plaque is given to honor the officers' bravery the next day.

Cast

The Police Force 
 Matt McCoy as Sergeant Nick Lassard 
 Michael Winslow as Sergeant Larvell Jones 
 David Graf as Sergeant Eugene Tackleberry 
 Bubba Smith as Lieutenant Moses Hightower 
 Marion Ramsey as Sergeant Laverne Hooks 
 Leslie Easterbrook as Lieutenant Debbie Callahan  
 George Gaynes as Commandant Eric Lassard 
 G. W. Bailey as Captain Thaddeus Harris
 Lance Kinsey as Lieutenant Carl Proctor
 George R. Robertson as Commissioner Henry Hurst
 Bruce Mahler as Sergeant Douglas Fackler

Others 
 Kenneth Mars as The Mayor / "The Mastermind" 
 Gerrit Graham as "Ace" 
 Brian Seeman as "Flash" 
 Darwyn Swalve as "Ox"
 Sippy Whiddon as M.G.
 Daniel Ben Wilson as Eugene Tackleberry Jr.
 Billie Bird as Mrs. Stanwyck
 Arthur Batanides as Mr. Kirkland
 Greg Collins as SWAT Leader
 Anna Mathias as Bank Teller
 Melle Mel as Rap Man
 Peter Elbling as Store Manager
 Allison Mack as Little Girl 
 Roberta Haynes as Bus Passenger
 Dean Norris as Cop
 Charlie Adler as Mastermind (voice)
 Paul Maslansky as Payphone Man

Landmarks 
Some of the landmarks and people in the film reference Toronto, the city where most of the first four Police Academy films were filmed. The police station is called Oakdale Police Station, referencing the Oakdale area of Toronto which a small area between the western intersections of Highway 400 and Finch Avenue, extending to just south of Sheppard Avenue, and east just past Jane Street.  This is often referred to as part of the Downsview area of Toronto. Additionally, the criminal organization behind the crime wave in the city is called the Wilson Heights Gang, a reference to Wilson Heights Boulevard, a street in the Downsview area. The specific area itself is called Wilson Heights as well.

Production 
Police Academy 6: City Under Siege was filmed entirely in Los Angeles, California.

Reception

Critical response 
On Rotten Tomatoes, the film has a 0% rating based on 7 reviews. On Metacritic, the film has a score of 16% based on reviews from 8 critics, indicating "Overwhelming dislike". Audiences polled by CinemaScore gave the film a grade B−.

Pete Hammond in Leonard Maltin's Movie Guide gave Police Academy 6: City Under Siege a BOMB rating, writing that "This entry is only—repeat only—for those who thought Police Academy 5 was robbed at Oscar time". The DVD/Video Guide by Mick Martin and Marsha Porter gave the first two Police Academy films 2 stars out of 5; and each subsequent film received a Turkey (their lowest score). 

Variety wrote: "Director Peter Bonerz and writer Stephen J. Curwick (the latter taking his second Academy shift) both cut their teeth on TV sitcoms, and it shows. Rarely has a film cried out so desperately for a laughtrack."
Richard Harrington of The Washington Post wrote: "In Police Academy 6: City Under Siege, the humor (kind word, that one) vacillates between the soporific and the moronic."

Box office 
The film performed poorly at the US box office, opening on March 10, 1989 in second place behind Lean on Me with an opening weekend gross of $4,032,480. It was the first Police Academy film not to place first in the US weekend box office. It ultimately took in a low total of $11,567,217 in the US and Canada  and $33,190,000 worldwide.

References

External links 
 
 
 
 

 6
1989 films
1980s police comedy films
American sequel films
1980s English-language films
Films shot in Los Angeles
Warner Bros. films
Films scored by Robert Folk
Films directed by Peter Bonerz
1989 comedy films
Films produced by Paul Maslansky
1980s American films